Lieutenant General G. M. Nair, PVSM, AVSM, SM, VSM (b. 17 January 1952) commanded the Kangra based 9 Corps of Indian Army. Nair replaced Lt. General Avadesh Prakash who was the Military Secretary. Nair is an alumnus of the Sainik School, Kazhakootam.

Military career

A Sainik School, Kazhakootam alumnus, Lt Gen Nair joined the 40th Course of NDA, and was commissioned into 1/11 Gorkha Rifles in
1972. Nair has since held several important positions in the Indian army, including command of the 1/11 Gorkha Rifles during counter insurgency operations in Assam and Manipur,  the command of an infantry brigade in the western sector, command of 39 Mountain Division in Jammu and Kashmir and command of 9 Corps in J&K & the Punjab. He has participated in several strategic military operations such as Operation Parakram and Operation Rakshak. 

For a brief period he held the position of military observer in UN operations in Namibia and Instructor as a brigadier in Army War College, Mhow. Nair holds MS in Strategic Studies from US Army War College and has also attended US Army War College Course in Carlisle. Lt General Nair also holds a Masters in Defence Studies from Madras University, and M Phil in Defence and Management Studies from DAVV, Indore.

References

Malayali people
Military personnel from Thiruvananthapuram
Indian generals
Living people
1952 births
Sainik School alumni
Academic staff of Army War College, Mhow